Iyad Shalabi (or Eyad Shalaby, ; born 16 July 1987) is an Arab-Israeli Paralympic swimmer. 

Representing Israel at the 2020 Summer Paralympics, Shalabi won a gold medal in swimming at the 100m backstroke S1 event. Shalabi, who was born to a Muslim family in Shefa-Amr, Israel, is the first Arab-Israeli citizen to win an individual medal in either the Paralympics or the Olympics.

See also
Sports in Israel

References

External links
 

Living people
1987 births
Arab citizens of Israel
Israeli Muslims
Israeli male swimmers
Paralympic swimmers of Israel
Paralympic gold medalists for Israel
Paralympic medalists in swimming
Medalists at the 2020 Summer Paralympics
S1-classified Paralympic swimmers
Swimmers at the 2020 Summer Paralympics
People from Shefa-'Amr